On 18 January 2022, a series of floods occurred in northern Madagascar, especially around the Antananarivo area, where 11 people were killed. The floods were caused by heavy rainfall, with rainfall totals of up to 226 mm falling during the night of 17-18 January.

Impact

Madagascar
In total, 34 deaths were reported, 11 on January 18, and an additional 23 from Tropical Storm Ana on January 23. Rainfall totals reached up to 226 mm in parts of Madagascar.

See also
 Weather of 2022
 2022 East London floods

References

2022 floods in Africa
January 2022 events in Africa
2022 floods
Floods in Madagascar
2022 disasters in Madagascar